= BulbAmerica =

American lightbulb wholesaler

- Industry: Wholesaling
- Founded: 2003; 23 years ago
- Founder: Corey Frons
- Headquarters: Brooklyn, New York, United States
- Website: bulbamerica.com

BulbAmerica is the largest wholesale seller of lightbulbs in the U.S. The New York-based on-line outlet sells nearly 40,000 different light bulb types. BulbAmerica was started in 2003 by Corey Frons and is headquartered in Brooklyn, New York. In 2013, BulbAmerica was recognized by Inc. as one of the fastest-growing companies in America, with a 616% growth rate from 2009 to 2012.
